The #MeToo movement (Chinese: #WoYeShi) emerged in China shortly after it originated in the United States. In mainland China, online MeToo posts were slowed by government censorship. To avoid the censorship, Chinese women using the #MeToo hashtag on social media began using bunny and bowl-of-rice emojis; "rice bunny" is pronounced mi-tu in Chinese. Feminist activist Xiao Qiqi originated the use of rice-bunny emojis for the movement.

Universities 
The #MeToo movement began in China in 2017, when Luo Qianqian (罗茜茜) accused Beihang University professor Chen Xiaowu (陈小武) of sexually harassing her in 2004 while she was a PhD candidate. On the Chinese question-and-answer site Zhihu, Luo saw other former students discussing Chen's improper behaviour (including sexual assault and forced alcohol consumption); one former student had recorded proof of harassment. Luo then contacted the president of the Beihang Alumni Association to accuse Chen publicly. Xiao Qiqi’s hashtag #MeToo on the microblogging platform Weibo attracted more than 2.3 million views, and the university removed Chen from his teaching position. China Daily praised the university's actions, and encouraged students to continue exposing abusive educators.

As the #MeToo movement attracted public attention, Li Tingting's partner Xiao Meili wrote an open letter denouncing the lack of investigation of sexual harassment on Chinese university campuses. Meili suggested that universities offer education on sexual harassment to students, staff, and faculty with public lectures, hire investigators; and establish hotlines for students to report sexual harassment to school officials.

Peking University graduate Gu Huaying wrote a letter to the university, signed by 9,000 students, asking it to do more to prevent sexual harassment. The campaign faced pressure from school authorities and social-media censorship.

Professor Zhang Peng was removed from his teaching positions at Shanghai Normal University and Nanjing University when a #MeToo allegation accused him of raping one of his students while teaching at Peking University in 1998. The victim, 20-year-old sophomore Gao Yan, subsequently committed suicide.

Li Qi, a married professor at the Shanghai University of Traditional Chinese Medicine and doctor at the affiliated Shuguang Hospital, was fired by the university in 2022 after its investigation into his affair with a master's-degree student. The student had an abortion after becoming pregnant with his child, and alleged that Li had affairs with other female students by promising to help them publish papers, find jobs, or study overseas.

Workplace 
A female Foxconn assembly-line employee posted an article on the women's labour-rights website Jianjiaobuluo alleging that she had experienced daily sexual harassment at the workplace, including obscene jokes about her body and unwanted physical contact. After sexual harassment at Beihang University became known, she demanded that Foxconn educate managers and employees about sexual harassment, establish a hotline for reporting harassment, and display anti-sexual-harassment posters. The Foxconn employee encouraged other female employees, especially migrant workers and undocumented rural workers, to speak up.

In 2017, Chinese journalist Huang Xueqin publicised her experience of workplace sexual harassment. Her story encouraged similar reports, and a number of university academics were disciplined. She surveyed mainland women journalists on the extent of sexual harassment in the industry, and established an online platform for victims to share information with the hashtag #WoYeShi. In August 2019, Huang's passport was confiscated after a six-month trip abroad. She was arrested in Guangzhou in October of that year for "picking quarrels and provoking trouble", a charge often used by police to detain activists. Although Huang had shared photos of Hong Kong protesters, it was unclear if her arrest was related.

Religion 
Allegations emerged in 2018 of sexual misconduct by Xuecheng, the abbot of Longquan Monastery. Two monks at Beijing Longhua Temple, Shi Xianxia and Shi Xianqi, published a 95-page online report accusing their religious leader of sexual harassment. Xuecheng reportedly sent sexually-harassing text messages to Xianjia, a nun, and five female disciples from Kek Lok Temple in Malaysia. Two rejected his advances, but four disciples finally agreed to Xuecheng's sexual demands. According to the report, the female disciples were sexually harassed to make them dependent on the abbot’s religious power. The Haidian district police received alerts of a sexual assault at the temple in June 2018. Xuecheng was also an official of the Chinese Communist Party, in charge of the government-run Buddhist Association. As a result of the #MeToo movement, he lost his position as abbot and is under investigation for sexual misconduct as a religious and political leader.

Government 

For The Spectator, Cindy Yu wrote about the modern phenomenon of Communist Party officials keeping concubines. Yu noted that after Xi Jinping’s 2012 anti-corruption campaign in which all 100,000 officials indicted had had at least one extramarital affair, public discussion of officials' mistresses ended. "Decadence still goes on beneath the surface", however, and Peng Shuai "revealed a rot at the highest level of the party, a dangerous thing to do in Xi’s China". Although Chinese authorities have charged officials with sexual misconduct under corruption statutes, this was the first time a member of the top echelon of the CCP has faced public allegations.

On November 2, 2021, professional tennis player Peng Shuai accused former Vice Premier and cadre official Zhang Gaoli of sexual assault. Peng then vanished from public view in what was suspected to be an enforced disappearance, with severe censorship of her story by the Chinese government. State media appearances were suspected of being staged out of fear of government reprisals. E-mails and publications have said that Peng denies making the accusation of sexual assault. The incident has attracted international concern about Peng's safety, and the WTA suspended all events in China.

Police intervention and government censorship 
In 2015, a group of five Chinese feminists (Da Tu, Li Tingting, Wei Tingting, Wu Rongrong, and Wang Man) planned to distribute flyers on International Women’s Day to protest sexual harassment on public transportation. On March 7, the day before the planned protest, they were arrested and held in custody for 37 days for “picking quarrels and provoking trouble”. The group became known as the Feminist Five. Da Tu said that her feminist organization was reported to the police and forced to close, and feminist performance art and public protest had become almost impossible. She had been fighting sexual harassment in China since 2012, the public space for such activism was drastically reduced in 2014 by Chinese government censorship and police intervention. In prison, Li Tingting's lesbianism was mocked.

References

Bibliography 

 Fincher, Leta Hong. Betraying Big Brother, The Feminist Awakening in China. London: Verso, 2018.

 
 
Shi Xianxia and Shi Xianqi. [A Report on a Significant Situation].
 
 

Women in China
Movements in Asia
Chinese culture
China
Feminism in China